Nick Feely  is an Australian professional footballer who plays as a goalkeeper for Oakleigh Cannons FC.

Personal life
Nick is the son of English former professional footballer Peter Feely.

Feely played for Celtic F.C. at the 2011 HKFC International Soccer Sevens in Hong Kong. He was also selected for the Australian side at the 2011 FIFA U-20 World Cup.

References

External links

1992 births
Living people
Association football goalkeepers
Australian soccer players
Hong Kong footballers
Celtic F.C. players
Clyde F.C. players
Perth Glory FC players
A-League Men players
National Premier Leagues players